The FIFA World Cup, often simply called the World Cup, is an international association football competition contested by the men's national teams of the members of Fédération Internationale de Football Association (FIFA), the sport's global governing body. The championship has been awarded every four years since the first tournament in 1930, except in 1942 and 1946, due to World War II.

The tournament consists of two parts, the qualification phase and the final phase (officially called the World Cup Finals). The qualification phase, which currently takes place over the three years preceding the Finals, is used to determine which teams qualify for the Finals. The current format of the Finals involves 32 teams competing for the title, at venues within the host nation (or nations) over a period of about a month. The World Cup Finals is the most widely viewed sporting event in the world, with an estimated 715.1 million people watching the 2006 tournament final.

Morocco have qualified for the final stages of the FIFA World Cup on six occasions, which were in 1970, 1986, 1994, 1998, 2018 and 2022. Their best performance was in 2022 when they finished in fourth place, thus becoming both the first African and Arab nation to reach a semi-final at a World Cup.

Overall record

By match

Squads

Record players

Most matches played

Top goalscorers

Most tournament appearances 
Altogether thirteen players share the record of two participations.

Historical performances 
The Morocco team had many records and facts which had done during its participations in the world cup.

1970: First African country to draw a match at the World Cup Finals, with 1–1 draw with Bulgaria.
 1986: First African and Arab team to reach round of 16.
 1986: First African and Arab team to top the group stage.
 1998: Youssef Chippo of Morocco. first African to score an own goal at the World Cup, in the 2–2 draw against Norway on 10 June 1998.
 2018: Sofyan Amrabat of Morocco, who came on as a substitute for his brother Nordin Amrabat in the 76th minute in the group match against Iran, is the first player in World Cup history to come in for his brother.
 2022: First African team to reach 7 points at the group stage. 
 2022: First Arab nation to advance to the quarter-finals by defeating Spain 3–0 in a penalty shoot-out.
2022: Walid Regragui of Morocco, first African and Arab manager to reach the quarter finals.
2022: Morocco becomes first African and first Arab nation to reach semi-finals following a 1–0 victory over Portugal.
2022: Walid Regragui of Morocco, first African and Arab manager to reach the semi-finals.
2022: First African team to play 7 matches in one edition.
2022: First African team to achieve fourth place in the tournament.

References

External links
Morocco at FIFA

 
Countries at the FIFA World Cup
World Cup